The Friedmann equations are a set of equations in physical cosmology that govern the expansion of space in homogeneous and isotropic models of the universe within the context of general relativity. They were first derived by Alexander Friedmann in 1922 from Einstein's field equations of gravitation for the Friedmann–Lemaître–Robertson–Walker metric and a perfect fluid with a given mass density  and pressure . The equations for negative spatial curvature were given by Friedmann in 1924.

Assumptions 

The Friedmann equations start with the simplifying assumption that the universe is spatially homogeneous and isotropic, that is, the cosmological principle; empirically, this is justified on scales larger than the order of 100 Mpc. The cosmological principle implies that the metric of the universe must be of the form

where  is a three-dimensional metric that must be one of (a) flat space, (b) a sphere of constant positive curvature or (c) a hyperbolic space with constant negative curvature. This metric is called Friedmann–Lemaître–Robertson–Walker (FLRW) metric. The parameter  discussed below takes the value 0, 1, −1, or the Gaussian curvature, in these three cases respectively. It is this fact that allows us to sensibly speak of a "scale factor" .

Einstein's equations now relate the evolution of this scale factor to the pressure and energy of the matter in the universe. From FLRW metric we compute Christoffel symbols, then the Ricci tensor. With the stress–energy tensor for a perfect fluid, we substitute them into Einstein's field equations and the resulting equations are described below.

Equations 
 

There are two independent Friedmann equations for modelling a homogeneous, isotropic universe. The first is:

which is derived from the 00 component of Einstein's field equations. The second is:

which is derived from the first together with the trace of Einstein's field equations (the dimension of the two equations is time−2). 

 

in the Friedmann model.  is the Hubble parameter.

We see that in the Friedmann equations,  does not depend on which coordinate system we chose for spatial slices.

 or  depending on whether the shape of the universe is a closed 3-sphere, flat (Euclidean space) or an open 3-hyperboloid, respectively. If , then  is the radius of curvature of the universe. If , then  may be fixed to any arbitrary positive number at one particular time. If , then (loosely speaking) one can say that  is the radius of curvature of the universe.
 is the scale factor which is taken to be 1 at the present time.  is the current spatial curvature (when ). If  is positive, then the universe is hyperspherical. If , then the universe is flat. If  is negative, then the universe is hyperbolic.

Using the first equation, the second equation can be re-expressed as 

which eliminates  and expresses the conservation of mass–energy:

These equations are sometimes simplified by replacing

to give:

The simplified form of the second equation is invariant under this transformation.

The Hubble parameter can change over time if other parts of the equation are time dependent (in particular the mass density, the vacuum energy, or the spatial curvature). Evaluating the Hubble parameter at the present time yields Hubble's constant which is the proportionality constant of Hubble's law. Applied to a fluid with a given equation of state, the Friedmann equations yield the time evolution and geometry of the universe as a function of the fluid density.

Some cosmologists call the second of these two equations the Friedmann acceleration equation and reserve the term Friedmann equation for only the first equation.

Density parameter 

The density parameter  is defined as the ratio of the actual (or observed) density  to the critical density  of the Friedmann universe. The relation between the actual density and the critical density determines the overall geometry of the universe; when they are equal, the geometry of the universe is flat (Euclidean). In earlier models, which did not include a cosmological constant term, critical density was initially defined as the watershed point between an expanding and a contracting Universe.

To date, the critical density is estimated to be approximately five atoms (of monatomic hydrogen) per cubic metre, whereas the average density of ordinary matter in the Universe is believed to be 0.2–0.25 atoms per cubic metre. 

A much greater density comes from the unidentified dark matter; both ordinary and dark matter contribute in favour of contraction of the universe. However, the largest part comes from so-called dark energy, which accounts for the cosmological constant term. Although the total density is equal to the critical density (exactly, up to measurement error), the dark energy does not lead to contraction of the universe but rather may accelerate its expansion. 

An expression for the critical density is found by assuming  to be zero (as it is for all basic Friedmann universes) and setting the normalised spatial curvature, equal to zero. When the substitutions are applied to the first of the Friedmann equations we find:

(where . For , i.e.).
            
The density parameter (useful for comparing different cosmological models) is then defined as:

This term originally was used as a means to determine the spatial geometry of the universe, where  is the critical density for which the spatial geometry is flat (or Euclidean). Assuming a zero vacuum energy density, if  is larger than unity, the space sections of the universe are closed; the universe will eventually stop expanding, then collapse. If  is less than unity, they are open; and the universe expands forever. Then it is a matter of measuring the different components, usually designated by subscripts. According to the ΛCDM model, there are important components of  due to baryons, cold dark matter and dark energy. The spatial geometry of the universe has been measured by the WMAP spacecraft to be nearly flat. This means that the universe can be well approximated by a model where the spatial curvature parameter  is zero; however, this does not necessarily imply that the universe is infinite: it might merely be that the universe is much larger than the part we see. 

The first Friedmann equation is often seen in terms of the present values of the density parameters, that is

Useful solutions 

The Friedmann equations can be solved exactly in presence of a perfect fluid with equation of state

In spatially flat case, the solution for the scale factor is

where  is some integration constant to be fixed by the choice of initial conditions. For example,  describes a matter-dominated universe, where the pressure is negligible with respect to the mass density. From the generic solution one easily sees that in a matter-dominated universe the scale factor goes as

 matter-dominated

Another important example is the case of a radiation-dominated universe, namely when . This leads to

 radiation-dominated

In this case the energy density is constant and the scale factor grows exponentially.

Solutions for other values of  can be found at

Mixtures
If the matter is a mixture of two or more non-interacting fluids each with such an equation of state, then

holds separately for each such fluid . In each case,

from which we get

For example, one can form a linear combination of such terms

One then substitutes this into

Detailed derivation
To make the solutions more explicit, we can derive the full relationships from the first Friedman equation:

with

Solutions for the dependence of the scale factor with respect to time for universes dominated by each component can be found. In each we also have assumed that , which is the same as assuming that the dominating source of energy density is approximately 1.

which recovers the aforementioned 

The -dominated universe solution is of particular interest because the second derivative with respect to time is positive, non-zero; in other words implying an accelerating expansion of the universe, making  a candidate for dark energy:

Rescaled Friedmann equation 

Set

Then we can have

where

For any form of the effective potential , there is an equation of state  that will produce it.

In popular culture 

Several students at Tsinghua University (PRC President Xi Jinping's alma mater) participating in the 2022 COVID-19 protests in China carried placards with Friedmann equations scrawled on them, interpreted by some as a play on the words "Free man". Others have interpreted the use of the equations as a call to “open up” China and stop its Zero Covid policy, as the Friedmann equations relate to the expansion, or “opening” of the universe.

See also 
 Mathematics of general relativity
 Solutions of Einstein's field equations
 Warm inflation

Notes

Further reading 
 

General relativity
Equations